Rivallino Sleur (born 17 March 1976) is a Dutch former professional footballer who played as a defender.

During his professional career, he played for AZ Alkmaar and for Austria Klagenfurt before spending the rest of his career at semi-professional level at lower tier clubs in the Netherlands.

References

External links
 

1976 births
Living people
Dutch footballers
Association football midfielders
Alphense Boys players
Ter Leede players
JOS Watergraafsmeer players
AZ Alkmaar players
FC Kärnten players
Amsterdamsche FC players
AFC Ajax (amateurs) players
FC Lisse players
Quick Boys players
A.V.V. Zeeburgia players
Dutch expatriate footballers
Expatriate footballers in Austria
Dutch expatriate sportspeople in Austria
2. Liga (Austria) players